The Pool War was a conflict between the Republic of the Congo and the Ninja militia in the Pool Department, a department in the southeastern part of the country. Tensions grew between Frédéric Bintsamou (also known as Pastor Ntumi) and Congolese president Denis Sassou-Nguesso, after Bintsamou contested modifications to the constitution. Bintsamou was formerly a collaborator of Sassou-Nguesso.

Between April 2016 and April 2017, a total of 115 people died in the conflict. An estimated 13,000 people have been displaced as a result of the violence.

Background
In March 2016 Denis Sassou Nguesso, who ruled for more than 30 years over Congo-Brazzaville, was re-elected in the 2016 presidential election. After the victory of Nguesso was declared, the opposition claimed the election was a fraud and clashes broke out soon after, in the southern part of Brazzaville, three police officers and two gunmen were killed in the clashes. The government claimed the Ninjas were the raiders and they were responsible for the attacks. According to the following Tuesday's statement from the government 2 civilians and 12 assailants were killed. The government also stated that it arrested fifty ex-militants after an attack.

Timeline

On 4 April 2016, the Congolese government accused the Ninja militia of attacking security forces. The militia denied the accusations, calling them false pretext for political suppression. Violence continued with events such as shelling by the Congolese armed forces and attacks on trains by the Ninja militia. On 18 April 2017, 18 Congolese soldiers were killed by Ninja militiamen. The Congolese government and the Ninja militia signed a ceasefire agreement on 23 December 2017. Pursuant to the terms of the agreement, the Ninjas were to hand over their arms and cease their interference with trade between the cities of Brazzaville and Pointe Noire.

Aftermath
Despite the end of the war, it wasn't until November 2018 that the Congo-Ocean Railway traffic was resumed.

References

Conflicts in 2016
Conflicts in 2017
2016 in the Republic of the Congo
2017 in the Republic of the Congo
Civil wars involving the states and peoples of Africa
Insurgencies in Africa
Wars involving the Republic of the Congo